Anthophila colchica is a moth in the family Choreutidae. It was described by Aleksandr Sergeievich Danilevsky in 1969. It is found in Georgia and Russia.

References

Choreutidae
Moths described in 1969